Magnolia chapensis (syn. Michelia chapensis) is a species of flowering plant in the family Magnoliaceae, native to southern China and northern Vietnam. A tree reaching , it is hardy to USDA zone 7b. It has found wide use as a street tree in southern Chinese cities.

References

chapensis
Flora of South-Central China
Flora of Southeast China
Flora of Vietnam
Plants described in 2001